Hababam Sınıfı Sınıfta Kaldı (The Chaos Class Failed The Class) is a 1975 Turkish comedy film, directed by Ertem Eğilmez based on a novel by Rıfat Ilgaz. The film is a sequel to Hababam Sınıfı. It is the first film in which Şener Şen and Kemal Sunal starred together, and it is the last movie of Hababam Class starring Tarık Akan.

Plot 
"Hababam Class," who fooled Mahmut Hoca with phony diplomas, returned to the Almca Private High School and remained in the classroom. But the class is in trouble thanks to Badi Ekrem, the new physical education teacher. The teacher, who exercises and runs the class continuously, infrequently plays the ball in class. Following the departure of the literature instructor, a young literature teacher named Semra arrived at the school. Meanwhile, Mahmut Hoca, who has cured, has returned to the school; he wishes to resign as assistant principal, but the school principal insists that he do so conditionally.

The Mahmut Hoca  class warns Semra to treat Hoca  with respect, but the class ignores Mahmut Hoca. At the first warning, the class students who used Semra Hoca  as a cleaning arm in the teachers' room are smoking in the teachers' room. Mahmut Hoca  apprehends the students and warns them not to make their first mistake. Ferit and Necmi, who discover that Şaban is in love with Semra Hoca , write a love letter to Şaban with their own hands, and Şaban is overjoyed when he reads these letters and begins to write love letters to Semra Hoca . Ferit and Necmi, after reading Şaban's responses, begin to write more letters.

After the initial warning, the Hababam class informed Semra Hoca that that day was the anniversary of Tevfik Fikret's death, and they leave school to go to the cemetery and invite Semra Hoca to the match, but if she doesn't, leave them to the Fenerbahçe match. Semra Hoca complains to Mahmut Hoca about the class. Mahmut Hoca also greets the class at the door and informs them that they will be disgraced if they stand on one foot in front of the entire school in the schoolyard. During the class, the teacher has a disagreement with Semra Hoca, and the teacher leaves the room to leave the school, but Semra is discouraged from making this request. When the genuine inspector learns that the inspector Hüseyin evki Topuz has arrived at the school, he enters the class on the inspector number supplied by Güdük Necmi previously, and Akil Hoca guesses that the same number has been made and throws the inspector out of the class, before informing the principal Akil Hoca that he is the genuine inspector.

When the Hababam Classroom discovers that the Minister of National Education is a student of Akil Hoca, they return him to school. Şaban, who believes Ferit and Necmi are from Semra Hoca, slapped Semra Hoca three times like a cow in the lecture, and the entire class wrote love letters on the exam papers in the teacher's exam. When the teacher sees this, he loses patience and disciplines the entire class. He also calls the parents of the students who will return to school to speak with them, and Semra Hoca realizes that the fault is not with the students but with their parents, and he forgives the entire class.

Cast
 Kemal Sunal as İnek Şaban
 Münir Özkul as Mahmut Hoca (Vice Principal)
 Tarık Akan as Damat Ferit
 Adile Naşit as Hafize Ana
 Semra Özdamar - Semra Hoca
 Halit Akçatepe as Güdük Necmi
 Teoman Ayık - Öğrenci
 Feridun Şavlı - Domdom Ali
 Ahmet Arıman as Hayta İsmail
 Cem Gürdap as Tulum Hayri
 Şener Şen as Badi Ekrem (Physical Education teacher)
 Ertuğrul Bilda as Külyutmaz Hoca (Biology teacher)
 Kemal Ergüvenç as Kemal Hoca
 Akil Öztuna as Lütfü Hoca (Philosophy teacher)
 Muharrem Gürses as the headmaster

External links
 

1975 films
1975 comedy films
Films based on Turkish novels
Films set in Istanbul
Films shot in Istanbul
1970s Turkish-language films
Turkish comedy films
Turkish sequel films
Films set in universities and colleges
1976 comedy films
1976 films